State elections in 2022 were held in Johor in March 2022 after the dissolution of the legislative assembly in January 2022. On 10 October 2022, Prime Minister Ismail Sabri Yaakob announced a special announcement on television that Dewan Rakyat will be dissolved, hence paving way for the 15th General Election. Additionally, he recommended that other states with the exception of Johor, Malacca, Sarawak & Sabah do the same.

Consequently, Barisan Nasional Chairman, Datuk Seri Dr Ahmad Zahid Hamidi proclaimed that BN-led states (Perlis, Pahang & Perak) will be dissolving simultaneously.

On 14 October 2022, Perlis and Pahang state legislative was dissolved.

Important Dates

Johor

Perlis

Pahang

Perak

References

2022 elections in Malaysia
2022